The 1994–95 Southampton F.C. season was the club's third in the Premier League, and their 25th in the top division of English football. Having narrowly avoided relegation from the league the previous season, the club were looking to improve their performances in order to remain in the top flight for another year. After finishing 18th in the division for two consecutive seasons, Southampton managed to finish 10th in the Premier League, their best top-flight finish since 1990. They also reached the fifth round of the FA Cup, and the third round of the League Cup.

Southampton acted conservatively in the 1994 summer transfer window, although did make notable signings in the form of Zimbabwean goalkeeper Bruce Grobbelaar from Liverpool and Danish midfielder Ronnie Ekelund from Barcelona. After Christmas the spending was increased, with strikers Neil Shipperley and Gordon Watson moving to Southampton from Chelsea and Sheffield Wednesday respectively, both for fees in excess of £1 million. Notable departures included striker Iain Dowie halfway through the season, and defender Jeff Kenna near the end of the campaign.

At the end of the season Southampton finished 10th in the Premier League table with 12 wins, 18 draws and 12 losses, although only nine points above the relegation zone. Matthew Le Tissier was the club's top scorer with 19 goals in the league, making him the seventh best goalscorer in the league that season. Le Tissier also won the Southampton Player of the Season award, surpassing Peter Shilton and Tim Flowers as the first player to win the award a third time.

FA Premier League

Southampton's start to the third Premier League season saw the Hampshire side pick up just two points from their first four games, all in August, including a 5–1 thrashing at the hands of Newcastle United. The following month was much more positive for the club, who picked up four wins out of five games, including a late win at Tottenham Hotspur and 3–1 wins against Coventry City and Ipswich Town. The Saints lost their next three games, and won only one of their November fixtures, a tightly-fought 1–0 victory over Arsenal. The run-up to Christmas was similarly difficult, with Southampton picking up only one win from a possible three.

Saints hosted Wimbledon on Boxing Day 1994, and eventually lost 3–2 after a close match-up between the sides. It took the Saints almost three months to win a match again, during which time the club dropped to 20th in the table. Between 28 December 1994 and 18 March 1995, Southampton took part in an amazing nine draws, including late losses of leads against Manchester City and Norwich City, and lost their other two matches at Ipswich Town and Nottingham Forest.

Luck changed for the Saints after this poor run of results, as they picked up important victories against high-profile opponents Newcastle United (in which Southampton's three goals were scored within the last four minutes) and Tottenham Hotspur, and later against Chelsea and a number of other teams. Despite winning only one of their final five fixtures, the club remained in 10th position in the Premier League come the end of the season, with just ten points between themselves and the relegation zone.

FA Cup
As a Premier League club, Southampton entered the 1994–95 FA Cup in the Third Round. They were drawn against First Division side Southend United, who the Saints defeated comfortably 2–0 to move onto the Fourth Round. In the next match against Luton Town the sides drew 1–1, but Southampton asserted their dominance in the replay with a 6–0 home win. In the Fifth Round, against Tottenham Hotspur, a replay was required again after another 1–1 draw, but it was Spurs who enjoyed the spoils when they defeated the Saints 6–2 in the second game, with Ronny Rosenthal scoring a hat-trick.

League Cup
As a Premier League club, Southampton entered the 1994–95 Football League Cup in the Second Round. They were drawn against Second Division side Huddersfield Town, whom they eliminated with 1–0 and 4–0 wins, all goals coming from Matthew Le Tissier. Fellow FA Premier League side Sheffield Wednesday were the opposition in the Third Round, and a goal from Chris Bart-Williams was enough to eliminate the South Coast side from the competition.

Squad statistics

Appearances and goals

Most appearances

Top goalscorers

Transfers

References

Southampton F.C. seasons
Southampton